The following is a list of county routes in Mercer County in the U.S. state of New Jersey.  For more information on the county route system in New Jersey as a whole, including its history, see County routes in New Jersey.

500-series county routes
In addition to those listed below, the following 500-series county routes serve Mercer County:
CR 518, CR 524, CR 526, CR 533, CR 535, CR 539, CR 546, CR 569, CR 571, CR 579, CR 583

Other county routes

See also

References

 
Mercer